Beyond Violence: Jewish Survivors in Poland and Slovakia, 1944–48 (2014) is a book by the Polish historian Anna Cichopek, based on her PhD thesis at the University of Michigan, which examines Holocaust survivors in postwar Poland and Slovakia and how they went about regaining their Aryanized property, obtaining citizenship in their country of residence, and dealing with violence from non-Jews.

References

Further reading

2014 non-fiction books
History books about the Holocaust
Aftermath of the Holocaust
Jewish Polish history
Jewish Slovak history
Cambridge University Press books
History books about Slovakia
History books about Poland